The Working Group Against Enforced and Involuntary Disappearance has been set up to investigate cases in which persons are detained or killed by states in secret prisons and the corpses are disposed of so that nothing can be proven to them.

The UN mandate
The UN Human Rights Commission created this body on February 29, 1980 by means of a resolution, which also defined the mandate. This UN mandate is limited to three years and is regularly renewed. After the UN Human Rights Commission was replaced in 2006 by the UN Human Rights Council, it is now in charge and exercising oversight. The last extension of the mandate took place on October 6, 2020.

The members of the working group are not United Nations staff but are mandated by the UN  and the UN Human Rights Council has adopted a code of conduct. The independent status of elected representatives is crucial for the impartial performance of their duties. The term of office of a mandate is limited to a maximum of six years.

The working group prepares thematic studies and develops guidelines for the improvement of human rights. She makes country visits and can make recommendations in an advisory capacity. Its tasks include examining communications and proposing to States how to remedy any abuses. It also makes follow-up procedures, in which it reviews the implementation of the recommendations. To this end, it draws up annual reports to the attention of the UN Human Rights Council and the UN General Assembly.

Members of the WEIGD

Relevant international human rights instruments 
Refer to the International Convention for the Protection of All Persons from Enforced Disappearance.

References

External links
 Working Group on Enforced or Involuntary Disappearances

United Nations Human Rights Council